Looksery is an American software and photography company founded in 2013 by Victor Shaburov and Yurii Monastyrshin. The company is based in San Francisco and owned by Snap Inc. The company developed the Looksery application that does facial modification of photos in real time on mobile platforms.

The company has offices in the United States and Ukraine.

History
Victor Shaburov founded Looksery company in 2013 in San Francisco. Shaburov was sponsoring a programming contest in Ukraine, which Yurii Monastyrshin won twice in succession. Victor offered him to become a co-founder of the startup. In 2014, offices were established in Odesa, Ukraine and Sochi, Russia. Later, the company launched a Kickstarter campaign in order to raise funds, and exceeded their fundraising goal.

In September 2015, Looksery was acquired by Snap Inc. for $150 million, marking the biggest startup acquisition in Ukraine’s history. Snapchat used the Looksery technology to launch a new feature, Lenses.

Application 
Before Snapchat's acquisition, Looksery was available as a stand-alone application for iOS and Android. Looksery’s mobile application enabled users to simulate their appearance for a photo or video chat in real-time. Additionally, users could share photos and videos through popular social networks and messengers. When Snapchat launched its product, Lenses, Looksery was withdrawn as a stand-alone product. In June 2014 Looksery launched on crowdfunding site Kickstarter an app that makes you look better on video chat.

Reception
Looksery garnered a lot of media attention. Vogue selected Looksery as one of the ten Best Apps of 2014 and wrote that "it’s truly addictive and instantly fills you with the childlike energy and creativity of playing make-believe". TechCrunch called it "a clever application that lets you change your facial features..." and Inc. wrote that "[it] is an example of technology that may make it easier for camera-shy folks to sit through live video calls or take pictures in the future."

Awards 
In 2014, Looksery won the Best Innovative Startup Award at the SVOD annual conference in Silicon Valley.

References

Social media companies
Software companies based in California
Software companies established in 2013
Defunct software companies of the United States
2013 establishments in California
American companies established in 2013